Thomas Henry Kuchel (August 15, 1910 – November 21, 1994) was an American politician. A moderate Republican, he served as a US Senator from California from 1953 to 1969 and was the minority whip in the Senate, where he was the co-manager on the floor for the Civil Rights Act of 1964 and the Voting Rights Act of 1965. Kuchel voted in favor of the Civil Rights Acts of 1957, 1960, and 1964, as well as the 24th Amendment to the U.S. Constitution, the Voting Rights Act of 1965, and the confirmation of Thurgood Marshall to the U.S. Supreme Court, while Kuchel did not vote on the Civil Rights Act of 1968.

As of 2023, Kuchel is the last Republican to have held or win election to California’s Class 3 Senate seat.

Early life
Kuchel was born in Anaheim, Orange County, the son of Henry Kuchel, a newspaper editor and the former Letitia Bailey. Kuchel attended public school as a child. While he was at Anaheim High School, he was a yell leader and a member of the debate team. While there, he debated a team from Whittier High School, winning his own debate against his opponent and later intraparty rival, Richard Nixon.

Kuchel graduated from both the University of Southern California in 1932 and the University of Southern California Law School before he entered the state government.

Career
Kuchel served in the California State Assembly from 1937 to 1941, in the California State Senate from 1941 to 1945, and as California State Controller from 1946 to 1953. During World War II, Kuchel was a lieutenant commander in the U.S. Naval Reserve.

In 1953, Kuchel was appointed to the US Senate by Governor Earl Warren to fill the vacancy created after Republican Senator Richard Nixon was elected Vice President. Kuchel was elected to the remainder of Nixon's term in 1954 and to full terms in 1956 and 1962.

As a U.S. Senator, Kuchel had first attempted to steer clear of the factional infighting within the California Republican Party, which took place in the 1950s between Vice President Nixon, US Senate Republican Leader William F. Knowland, a conservative, and Republican Governor Goodwin J. Knight, a liberal. Known as a moderate, Kuchel eventually backed Knowland in his campaign to oust Knight in the Republican primary for governor in 1958. Knight then ran for the United States Senate, but he and Knowland both lost that year.

While running for a second full term in 1962, Kuchel pointedly refused to endorse ticket-mate Nixon's candidacy for governor in a heated race against incumbent Democrat Edmund G. "Pat" Brown, Sr. The 1962 election favored incumbents, as Brown beat Nixon by a comfortable margin and Kuchel coasted to victory. To date, Kuchel is the last Senatorial candidate to win all 58 California counties in a single election.

However, Kuchel broke with Knowland in 1964 when Knowland asked him to endorse Barry Goldwater for the Republican nomination for president, and Kuchel instead endorsed Nelson Rockefeller, who narrowly lost the California presidential primary to Goldwater.
 

While Kuchel was campaigning against Goldwater, a "vicious document" circulated that purported to be an affidavit signed by a Los Angeles police officer, saying that in 1949, he had arrested Kuchel. The document said that the arrest was for drunkenness while Kuchel had been in the midst of a sex act with a man. Four men were indicted for the libel: Norman H. Krause, a bar owner and ex-Los Angeles policeman, who had actually arrested two people in 1950 who worked in Kuchel's office for drunkenness; Jack D. Clemmons, a Los Angeles police sergeant until his resignation two weeks before his arrest; John F. Fergus, a public relations man for Eversharp, who was charged with possession of a concealed weapon and given a suspended sentence in 1947; and Francis A. Capell of Zarephath, New Jersey, the publisher of a right-wing newsletter.

During the 1966 California gubernatorial primary, Kuchel was urged by moderates to run against conservative actor Ronald Reagan. Citing the hostilities of the growing conservative movement, Kuchel decided not to run. He instead issued a negative statement about the conservatives: "A fanatical neo-fascist political cult of right-wingers in the GOP, driven by a strange mixture of corrosive hatred and sickening fear that is recklessly determined to control our party or destroy it!" Earlier in 1964, Kuchel warned in campaign ads for Rockefeller that the control of the right-wing movement in the Republican party would lead to the destruction of the two-party system.

Kuchel was narrowly defeated in the Republican primary in 1968 by conservative state Superintendent of Public Instruction Max Rafferty, who went on to lose the general election to Alan Cranston, the former State Controller, a position that had once been held by Kuchel himself. Kuchel returned to practicing law in California until his retirement, in 1981.

He was appointed by the Supreme Court to represent the appellee in United States v. 12 200-ft. Reels of Film.

Death
He died of lung cancer on November 21, 1994, in Beverly Hills.

Legacy
Secretary of Defense and former White House Chief of Staff and CIA Director Leon Panetta began in politics as a legislative assistant to Kuchel. Panetta would cite Kuchel as "a tremendous role model."

In August 2010, the Beverly Hills City Council paid tribute to Senator Kuchel on the 100th anniversary of his birth.  His widow Betty Kuchel and daughter Karen Kuchel accepted a proclamation from then Councilman and now mayor Dr. William Warren Brien, a grandson of Governor Earl Warren, at the August 17th council meeting.

References

External links

Oral History Interview with Thomas Kuchel, from the Lyndon Baines Johnson Library

Join California Thomas H. Kuchel

Further reading
"Honoring a True Public Servant: Senator Thomas Kuchel," Congressional Record, October 11, 2002.

|-

|-

|-

|-

|-

1910 births
1994 deaths
State Controllers of California
Republican Party California state senators
Republican Party members of the California State Assembly
American people of German descent
People from Anaheim, California
California Republican Party chairs
USC Gould School of Law alumni
Republican Party United States senators from California
20th-century American politicians
Richard Nixon
United States Navy personnel of World War II